New Jersey Teamsterz FC (known as New Jersey Teamsters FC until 2021) is an American professional soccer club based in Bayonne, New Jersey that plays in NISA Nation from 2021 and that will join the National Independent Soccer Association in 2022. The team formerly played in the United Premier Soccer League.

History
The Teamsterz were announced as a new member of the United Premier Soccer League (UPSL) on February 28, 2017.

The team began play in the Northeast Conference's American Division during the 2018 Spring UPSL season. In its first home match on April 14, 2018, at Don Ahern Veterans Memorial Stadium, the Teamsterz overcame two one goal deficits and finished with a 2–2 draw to earn its first ever competitive point. The group went on to finish third in its division, clinching a postseason spot before falling in the semifinals of the American Division playoffs to Junior Lone Star FC II. The following Spring, New Jersey finished second within the conference, now playing within a single table, but failed to make the national playoffs.

On February 26, 2020, the Teamsterz announced it had been accepted into the National Independent Soccer Association (NISA), a professionally sanctioned division 3 league, with plans to begin professional play in Spring 2021, though this was later pushed back to Fall due to then on-going COVID-19 pandemic. The organization further stated that it would not be fielding a UPSL team in 2020.

In 2020, team owners Sibrena and Alex Geraldino were featured on Discovery Channel's series "I Quit," which followed entrepreneurs who quit their jobs in order to launch new businesses. The team announced that they were changing the spelling of the team name from Teamsters to Teamsterz.

On 23rd August 2021, the Teamsterz announce that they would join NISA newly borned amateur league, the NISA Nation as founding member for the 2021 Fall season.

Year-by-year

Logo history

Honors
Atlantic Cup Champions: 2019

NJ Teamsterz FC Reserves
The Teamsterz field a reserve team in the fully amateur Garden State Soccer League (GSSL), which is sanctioned by the United States Adult Soccer Association within USASA Region I. The reserves play their home fixtures at Stephen R. Gregg Park in Bayonne, NJ, located a mile and a half north of Veterans Stadium.

Notes

References

External links
 

Soccer clubs in New Jersey
2017 establishments in New Jersey
Association football clubs established in 2017
Sports in Hudson County, New Jersey
Soccer clubs in the New York metropolitan area
Bayonne, New Jersey
National Independent Soccer Association teams